Peter Vasilevich Cornell (born June 1, 1976) is a retired American professional basketball player and occasional actor. In his 12-year career, he played for over 30 teams, in 15 leagues, and in 7 countries. As an actor, Cornell has been in over 60 national and international commercial campaigns, and has appeared in basketball-themed films. Most notably, he played the character Vakidis in 2008 comedy Semi-Pro. Cornell also dated two women from Netflix's Selling Sunset and is the stated source of their feud.

Early life
Cornell was born in San Francisco, California and raised in the small affluent town of Piedmont, California in the East Bay of the San Francisco Bay Area. He graduated from Piedmont High School in 1994 and received a full basketball scholarship to play at Loyola Marymount University.

External links
 Peter Cornell's NBA Draft Profile
 Peter Cornell's NBA.com Profile
 Peter Cornell's IMDb Profile
 Peter Cornell's Instagram

References

1976 births
Living people
American expatriate basketball people in China
American expatriate basketball people in Serbia
American expatriate basketball people in Japan
Basketball players from San Francisco
Centers (basketball)
Guangdong Southern Tigers players
KK Partizan players
Loyola Marymount Lions men's basketball players
Rizing Zephyr Fukuoka players
San Diego Wildfire players
Sun Rockers Shibuya players
Kawasaki Brave Thunders players
Zhejiang Golden Bulls players
American men's basketball players